Isidore Newman MBE CdeG MdeR (26 January 1916 – 7 September 1944) was a British secret agent in the French section of the Special Operations Executive during the Second World War.

Early life
He was born in Leeds on 26 January 1916, the son of Russian Jewish immigrants Joseph and Tilly Newman. He grew up in Durham where he trained as a primary school teacher, before moving to Hull in 1938, and had studied French at university though spoke it less than perfectly.

WWII
He joined the Royal Corps of Signals in August 1940, before joining the Special Operations Executive’s French (or F) Section in July 1941.

First mission

In Operation DELAY II Peter Churchill’s mission was to land four SOE agents  on the French Riviera by submarine.
On 26 February 1942 Churchill flew from Bristol to Gibraltar with two radio operators, Isidore Newman «Julien» for the URCHIN network and Edward Zeff «Matthieu» for the SPRUCE network, where they were joined by Marcel Clech «Bastien», radio operator for the AUTOGIRO network, and Victor Gerson «René», an SOE agent on a special mission to organise the VIC Escape Line. They travelled in HM Submarine P 42 “Unbroken” to Antibes where on the night of 21 April 1942 Churchill took Newman and Zeff and their radios to the shore by canoe, and led them to their contact Dr Élie Lévy. Churchill then returned to the submarine and dropped off Clech and Gerson by canoe at Pointe d’Agay near Fréjus before returning to the UK.

In May Newman joined the URCHIN network of Francis Basin "Olive" on the Côte d'Azur and established radio links with London, sending around 200 messages before  Basin was arrested in Cannes on 18 August.  Peter Churchill returned to Cannes on 27 August to organise and coordinate the SOE F Section SPINDLE Network which directed the delivery of supplies to support the CARTE Organisation run by André Girard and
Newman joined  SPINDLE as Network Manager. A quarrel arose between Newman and Girard because of the excessive length of the messages that Girard imposed on him, in contradiction with the rules of security. Considering it vital to remain on good terms with Girard, Churchill sent Newman back to London in early November.

Second mission
He was brought by Lysander on the night of 19/20 July 1943 near Azay-sur-Cher to be radio operator of Philippe Liewer's SALESMAN network in Rouen and Le Havre. His nom de guerre was "Peter" (or "Pepe"). During this mission Newman sent 54 messages. SALESMAN needed a reliable radio link with London to begin coordinating supply drops and made effective use of the arms it then received, sinking an 800-ton minesweeper in September, and wrecking a local power station the following month. Newman maintained tight security, transmitting from three separate locations and never transmitting more than twice from the same location before moving to the next, but German direction-finding teams were close to arresting him and he was forced to cease transmission for six weeks at one point. On 8 March 1944, Claude Malraux, who was temporarily in charge of SALESMAN, was arrested and within hours all his contacts were blown.

Arrest and death
Newman was arrested on 31 March 1944 and was subsequently suspected of revealing the locations of his safe houses.  He was taken to the Gestapo prison in Paris, then Fresnes prison, and lastly transferred to Mauthausen concentration camp where he was executed on 7 September 1944.

Recognition

Awards
Great Britain: Member of the Order of the British Empire (Military), Mentioned in Despatches 
France: Croix de Guerre, Médaille de la Résistance

Monuments
As one of the 104 agents of section F who lost their lives for France, Isidore Newman is honoured at The Valençay SOE Memorial, Indre, France.
Brookwood Memorial, Surrey, panel 21, column 3.

References

External sources 
 Biography of Isidore Newman by Nigel Perrin
The F Section Memorial, Gerry Holdsworth Special Forces Charitable Trust, 1992
 
Lt. Col. EG Boxshall, Chronology of SOE operations with the resistance in France during World War II, 1960, typed document (copy from the Pearl Witherington-Cornioley Library, available at the Valençay Library). See sheet 17, DONKEYMAN CIRCUIT and sheet 22, SALESMAN CIRCUIT.

Sir Brooks Richards, Secret Flotillas: the Clandestine Sea Lines to France and French North Africa, HMSO, 1996.
 'Fighting Back' by Martin Sugarman, Valentine Mitchell, 2017 and in 
 Jewish Hstorical Studies Volume 41, 2007

1916 births
1944 deaths
British Army personnel killed in World War II
British Special Operations Executive personnel
Executed spies
British people executed in Nazi concentration camps
Special Operations Executive personnel killed in World War II
British Army General List officers
Military personnel from Leeds
English people of Russian-Jewish descent